Cynthia Koh (born 25 March 1974), also known as Xu Mei Zhen 许美珍, is a Singaporean actress. She is best known for acting in many television dramas produced by MediaCorp Channel 8.

Early life
Koh has one younger sister. Her father works in the Singapore Civil Defence Force while her mother is a housewife. Koh received her education at Saint Anthony's Canossian Secondary School.

Career
While still enrolled in Singapore Broadcasting Corporation's (now MediaCorp) 10th Drama Artiste Course, Koh started acting at the TV station at the age of 18 in May 1992. Having acted in almost 46 dramas to date, Koh made her debut on stage in the critically acclaimed Men at Forty-Eight in 1997. Later, she won the Best Actress Award in Star Awards 1999 with her breakthrough performance in Stepping Out, in which she played a long-suffering woman fighting against her fate. This role earned her a nomination in the same category at the Asian Television Awards.

Koh was also part of the cast in three of MediaCorp TV Channel 8's long-running dramas. The 3 long-running dramas include: Holland V (Year 2003, 125 episodes), Portrait of Home (Year 2005, 100 episodes), Kinship (Year 2007, 86 episodes). Koh's role as Fu Baozhu (傅宝珠), a greedy and bossy woman in Portrait of Home granted her another Best Actress nomination in the Star Awards 2005. Unfortunately, she lost the award to veteran Huang Biren. While filming Mediacorp Channel U's blockbuster drama Show Hand in December 2011, it was reported that Koh delayed an ovarian cyst operation to finish filming the series. In 2012, after not receiving an award for 15 years at the annual Star Awards, Koh made her comeback, winning her second Top 10 Most Popular Female Artiste Award.

Koh has gotten 3 out of 10 Top 10 Most Popular Female Artistes from 1997, 2012 and 2022 respectively.

Filmography

Compilation album

Accolades

References

External links
 

Singaporean people of Teochew descent
Singaporean television personalities
Singaporean television actresses
20th-century Singaporean actresses
21st-century Singaporean actresses
Living people
1974 births